Walid Georgey (born 10 January 1995), known professionally as Maes, is a French rapper of Moroccan origin from Sevran. He has released two albums and a number of singles and is best known for "Madrina" featuring French rapper Booba. He's Moroccan originally.

Life and career
Maes grew up in Beaudottes in Sevran in the northeastern suburbs of Paris with his five brothers and two sisters. He started rapping at age of 14 forming the trio MSR with his friends Radmo and SY3. After high school, Maes served a sentence for 18 months in maison d'arrêt de Villepinte from 2016 to 2017. During his incarceration, he released a number of songs and a mixtape Réelle Vie. After release from detention, he released "#MaesEstLibérable", and debuted as a supporting act for the groupe 13 Block at the gig in La Bellevilloise in December 2017. On 2 March 2018, he released a second mixtape Réelle Vie 2.0 and upon its success was signed to the Millenium label, part of Capitol Music France. With the single "Madrina" featuring Booba, he topped SNEP, the French Singles Chart. The music video was shot in Bogota. With Millenium, he had released the albums Pure in 2018 and Les derniers salopards in 2020.

Discography

Albums

Mixtapes

Singles

As a lead artist

As a featured artist

Other charted songs

Notes

References

External links
 

1995 births
Living people
French rappers
Rappers from Seine-Saint-Denis
French people of Moroccan descent